The Mangapu River is a river of the Waikato region of New Zealand's North Island. It has its sources in numerous streams which flow generally northwards from the King Country south of Te Kuiti, the longest of which is the Mangaokewa Stream.

The New Zealand Ministry for Culture and Heritage gives a translation of "double stream" for Mangapū.

SH3 crosses the river on a  bridge near Ōtorohanga built in 1966 and near Hangatiki on a  concrete bridge built in 1977.

The river at Ōtorohanga is classed as being in the worst 25% of similar sites as regards all measured pollutants, though some attempts are being made at restoration.

Pehitawa Kahikatea Forest Reserve 

The reserve  of kahikatea forest on the east bank of the river, was purchased by the Native Forests Restoration Trust in 2001. A major drainage scheme was carried out just upstream from the reserve in the 1930s, including emptying of a lake. The forest floods in winter and flood protection would be uneconomic. Some kahikatea in the reserve are about 120 years old. The reserve also has swamp maire, matai, titoki and pukatea. Te Araroa long-distance walkway passes through the reserve and crosses the river on a suspension bridge.

See also
List of rivers of New Zealand

References

External links
 Flood levels at SH3 bridge near Hangatiki
 Google Street view of the river at SH3 bridge near Ōtorohanga
 Google Street view of the river at SH3 bridge near Hangatiki

Waitomo District
Rivers of Waikato
Rivers of New Zealand